Tri-State Speedway may refer to:

Tri-State Speedway (Indiana), a 1/4 mile dirt oval racing track in Haubstadt, Indiana
Tri-State Speedway (Oklahoma), a 3/8 mile dirt oval racing track in Pocola, Oklahoma